LA-42 is a constituency of Azad Kashmir Legislative Assembly which is currently represented by Syed Shaukat Ali Shah of Pakistan Tehreek-e-Insaf. It covers the area of Punjab (except Lahore Division Attock District Rawalpindi District in Pakistan. Only refugees from Kashmir Valley settled in Pakistan are eligible to vote.

Election 2016 

elections were held in this constituency on 21 July 2016.

Election 2021 
Syed Shaukat Ali Shah of  Pakistan Tehreek-e-Insaf won this seat by getting 1254 votes.

References 

Azad Kashmir Legislative Assembly constituencies